South Point is a higher-secondary co-educational private school located in Kolkata, West Bengal and affiliated to Central Board of Secondary Education,  consisting of three organisations – South Point School (Nursery to Class V), South Point High School (Classes VI to XII) and South Point Education Society (administrative authority). The school operates in two shifts for all classes – Morning and Afternoon. The school opened in 1954, and was the first co-educational school in Kolkata. Higher Secondary (10+2) education was introduced in 1960. Initially operation as a single unit, the school split into two buildings with the high school shifting to Ballygunge Place in 1980. It is claimed to be the only school in Kolkata to have a Nobel Laureate as an alumnus. The school was recorded as the world's largest school (in terms of student numbers) between 1984 and 1992 by the Guinness Book of Records.

History 
South Point School is an English-medium and co-educational school which was founded on 1 April 1954 at 16 Mandeville Gardens, Kolkata. Administration in the initial years was supervised by the founder Shri Satikanta Guha, his wife and co-founder Smt. Pritylata Guha.

On 1 April 1960, it was upgraded to the Higher Secondary level. To overcome space constraints, the High School wing was shifted to a new building at 82/7A Ballygunge Place on 8 April 1970. Since the acquisition of the institution by the M.P. Birla Group, the school is now run by the South Point Education Society.

South Point School, the "junior" school, has Nursery I, Nursery II, Transition and Classes from I to V. Students then attend classes at South Point High School from Class VI onwards. From Classes VI to X, students study under the Central Board of Secondary Education curriculum. A majority of Pointers return to the school for the +2 years, Classes XI and XII, under the Central Board of Secondary Education, under the Science, Commerce or Humanities streams, with several subject options available in each stream, after qualifying in the entrance/selection tests conducted by the school.

Previously, South Point High School had been affiliated to both the West Bengal Board of Secondary Education (and the West Bengal Council of Higher Secondary Education) and the Central Board of Secondary Education (CBSE). The West Bengal board however has been discontinued due to lack of demand, and now, the pupils appear for their Board examinations under CBSE only.

Safety standards and certification 
The South Point Education Society received the OHSAS 18001:2007 Occupational Health and Safety Management Certification from the British Standards Institution (BSI) in respect of South Point School, Mandeville Gardens, and South Point High School, Ballygunge Place on 2 August 2017. The OHSAS certification has been upgraded to ISO 45001:2018 standard.

The school has an integrated fire-fighting system, CCTV surveillance throughout the two campuses (barring Staff Rooms and toilets), GPS tracking facility on South Point School buses and other Occupational Health and Safety measures which are vital in maintaining the ageing school-buildings.

The Priyamvada Birla Campus 
In order to address space constraints and enhance infrastructure, South Point School and South Point High School will move to a new and much larger campus named the Priyamvada Birla Campus of South Point named after Late Smt. Priyamvada Birla, philanthropist and wife of M.P. Birla Group founder Late Shri Madhav Prasad Birla. The campus is currently under construction.

The new school will be located off the Eastern Metropolitan Bypass (Biswa Bangla Sarani) at Mukundapur, Kolkata, near the Satyajit Ray Film Institute and the Peerless Hospital. The junior and senior wings of the school will operate from a single campus once the school relocates here. The new campus might become functional in 2021-2022 (uncertain due to COVID-19 pandemic).

With a total area of 6.65 acres and more than 7,61,000 square feet of built-up area, the school will be one of the biggest schools (in terms of area) in the city.

Emblem and objective 
The School Emblem, showing a bird (dove or paloma) in flight, symbolizes "man's everlasting quest for knowledge and the desire to soar above the mundane." The motto of the School is 'Courage to Know'.

School houses 
South Point pupils are assigned to one of six Houses, named after famous personalities from Kolkata:

 Rabindranath Tagore House - Red 
 Derozio House - Yellow
 Ashutosh Mukherjee House - White
 Ishwar Chandra Vidyasagar House - Green
 David Hare House - Orange
 Sister Nivedita House - Blue

Notable alumni
 Saurabh Bagchi, Professor of Computer Science, Purdue University, ACM, IFIP, IEEE Distinguished Scientist, Humboldt Fellow
Abhijit Vinayak Banerjee, Professor of Economics, MIT, Nobel Laureate in Economics 
 Ritabrata Banerjee, politician, member of Rajya Sabha, India
 Tanmoy Bose, percussionist and tabla player
 Supriya Chaudhuri, scholar of English literature
 Aroup Chatterjee, doctor, author and critic
 Sumit Ranjan Das, High energy physicist and Shanti Swarup Bhatnagar laureate
 Saswata Chatterjee, critically acclaimed actor 
 Swarup Dutta, actor
 Abhik Ghosh, chemist, professor, and winner of the Hans Fischer Career Award (2022) for lifetime contributions
 Rituparno Ghosh, National Film Award-winning filmmaker
 Shamik Ghosh, Sahitya Akademi Yuva Puraskar (2017; Government of India) winning Bengali Author
 Prosenjit Chatterjee, National Film Award-winning Actor and Banga Vibhushan (Government of West Bengal) Awardee
 Pratim D. Gupta, film critic, filmmaker
 Bauddhayan Mukherji, filmmaker
 Srijit Mukherji, National Film Award-winning filmmaker and screenwriter
 Bedabrata Pain, National Film Award-winning filmmaker, scientist and inventor
 Sandip Ray, noted filmmaker (son of Satyajit Ray)
 Amitava Raychaudhuri, Shanti Swarup Bhatnagar laureate  and Professor Emeritus, Department of Physics, University of Calcutta
 Anuradha Roy, an acclaimed writer whose book ‘Sleeping on Jupiter’ was longlisted for The Man Booker Prize, 2015
 Sucharit Sarkar, mathematician
 Subrata Sen, filmmaker
 Riddhi Sen, National Film Award-winning actor
 Abhijit Mukherjee (Earth Scientist), scientist and Shanti Swarup Bhatnagar (Prize) laureate

References

Primary schools in West Bengal
High schools and secondary schools in West Bengal
Schools in Kolkata
Educational institutions established in 1954
1954 establishments in West Bengal